Murray Ryan (born 1966 or 1967) is a Canadian politician, who was elected to the Nova Scotia House of Assembly in a by-election on September 3, 2019. He represented the electoral district of Northside-Westmount as a member of the Progressive Conservative Association of Nova Scotia caucus until his defeat in the 2021 Nova Scotia general election.

Prior to his election to the legislature, Ryan worked as an accountant. He was selected as the party's replacement candidate in the by-election, after the dismissal of original candidate Danny Laffin.

References

Living people
Progressive Conservative Association of Nova Scotia MLAs
People from the Cape Breton Regional Municipality
Place of birth missing (living people)
21st-century Canadian politicians
Year of birth missing (living people)